The Women's AHF Cup is a quadrennial international women's field hockey competition in Asia organized by the Asian Hockey Federation. The tournament was founded in 1997 and serves as a qualification tournament for the next Women's Asia Cup.

Results

Summary

* = hosts

Team appearances

See also
 Men's AHF Cup
 Women's Hockey Asia Cup
 Women's Junior AHF Cup

References

External links
 Asian Hockey Federation
 todor66.com archive

 
AHF Cup
AHF Cup
AHF Cup